National Tennis Centre or National Tennis Center may refer to:
USTA Billie Jean King National Tennis Center, home of the US Open Grand Slam tennis tournament
National Tennis Centre (Australia), at Melbourne Park; now Rod Laver Arena, home of the Australian Open Grand Slam tennis tournament
National Tennis Centre (Canada), in Toronto, which was demolished in 2003
National Tennis Centre (United Kingdom), in London
National Tennis Centre, Bratislava, Slovakia, includes the Aegon Arena
National Tennis Center, Beijing, China; 2008 Summer Olympics venue

See also 
NTC (disambiguation)